William Montgomery (December 29, 1789 – November 27, 1844) was an American physician and politician from Orange County, North Carolina. He served in the North Carolina State Senate from 1824 to 1827, and from 1829 to 1834, and represented North Carolina in the United States House of Representatives from 1835 until 1841.

External links
Biographic sketch at U.S. Congress website

1789 births
1844 deaths
Democratic Party North Carolina state senators
Jacksonian members of the United States House of Representatives from North Carolina
Democratic Party members of the United States House of Representatives from North Carolina
19th-century American politicians